William Frazier (November 19, 1812 – June 7, 1885) was a Virginia lawyer and state legislator, who served in both the House of Delegates and the Senate, representing Augusta County.

Biography
Frazier was born at Jenning's Gap, Augusta County, Virginia, November 19, 1812, the son of James A and Martha (Rankin) Frazier. He left Yale College in August, 1830, and entered the University of Virginia, where after further academic and legal studies, he graduated in 1834 with the degree of Bachelor of Law.

In October, 1834, he was admitted to the bar in Staunton, Virginia, and settled in that city, being for a time in partnership with the Honorable John H. Peyton. In 1842, and for several later years, he represented the county in the Virginia State Legislature, and from 1861 to 1865 was a member of the Virginia State Senate. In 1853 his professional practice was interrupted by his being obliged, in consequence of the death of a brother, to assume the charge of the extensive health resort at Rockbridge Alum Springs, which absorbed most of his time and energies until 1869. He then returned to Staunton, and there spent the rest of his life, except from 1871 to 1876, when he had charge of the Capon Springs House in Capon Springs, West Virginia. He died in Staunton, June 7, 1885, in his 73d year.

He married, November 17, 1847, Sue M., daughter of James A. Lewis, of Charleston, West Virginia, who survived him with nine of their eleven children.

External links

1812 births
1885 deaths
People from Augusta County, Virginia
Yale College alumni
University of Virginia School of Law alumni
Members of the Virginia House of Delegates
Virginia state senators
19th-century American politicians
People from Hampshire County, West Virginia
People from Staunton, Virginia